The 2018 San Luis Open Challenger Tour was a professional tennis tournament played on hard courts. It was the 25th edition of the tournament which was part of the 2018 ATP Challenger Tour. It took place in San Luis Potosí, Mexico between 27 March and 1 April 2018.

Singles main-draw entrants

Seeds

 1 Rankings are as of 19 March 2018.

Other entrants
The following players received wildcards into the singles main draw:
  Lucas Gómez
  Tigre Hank
  Gerardo López Villaseñor
  Manuel Sánchez

The following players received entry from the qualifying draw:
  Roberto Cid Subervi
  Gonzalo Escobar
  Kevin Krawietz
  Pedro Sakamoto

Champions

Singles

 Marcelo Arévalo def.  Roberto Cid Subervi 6–3, 6–7(3–7), 6–4.

Doubles

 Marcelo Arévalo /  Miguel Ángel Reyes-Varela def.  Jay Clarke /  Kevin Krawietz 6–1, 6–4.

External links
Official Website

San Luis Open Challenger Tour
San Luis Potosí Challenger